Hila Plitmann (born August 9, 1973) is an Israeli operatic soprano specializing in the performance of new works.

Career

Education 
Juilliard School of Music: Bachelor of Music and Master of Music degrees with high honors

Performances 
Plitmann's professional career began in 1998, when she premiered Pulitzer Prize winner David Del Tredici's The Spider and the Fly with The New York Philharmonic under the baton of Kurt Masur.

Her theatrical acting debut was in the role of Sharon in the Fountain Theater's production of Master Class by Terrence McNally.

Other notable performances include the world premiere of Pulitzer Prize-winning composer David Del Tredici's Paul Revere's Ride with the Atlanta Symphony under Robert Spano; and the world premiere of Esa-Pekka Salonen's Wing on Wing with the Los Angeles Philharmonic at Disney Hall; the premiere of Eric Whitacre and David Norona's groundbreaking Paradise Lost: Shadows and Wings in Los Angeles; John Corigliano's Mr. Tambourine Man with the Brooklyn Philharmonic; the world premiere of Andrea Clearfield's The Long Bright with Orchestra 2001; the premiere of a new song cycle written for her by composer Aaron Jay Kernis; the Naxos world premiere recording of John Corigliano's Mr. Tambourine Man with the Buffalo Philharmonic Orchestra, JoAnn Falletta, conductor; and David Del Tredici's Final Alice with the National Symphony Orchestra under the direction of Leonard Slatkin.

In 2009, Plitmann created the role of Mrs Clayton in the Opera Santa Barbara production of Stephen Schwartz's opera Séance on a Wet Afternoon, and in 2015 she created the role of Yan in Mark Adamo's Becoming Santa Claus.

Awards 
In February 2009, Plitmann was awarded the Grammy Award for Best Classical Vocal Performance for her 2009 performance of Corigliano: Mr. Tambourine Man: Seven Poems Of Bob Dylan.

Recordings 

Ms. Inez Sez, song cycle by David Del Tredici, CRI label
Lament for the Death of a Bullfighter, song cycle by David Del Tredici (featuring the composer at the piano) Music & Arts label
Paul Revere's Ride by David Del Tredici with the Atlanta Symphony Orchestra, Robert Spano conducting, Telarc label
Emily Dickinson Songs by Bob Beaser with the American Academy, Rome label
Hans Zimmer's soundtrack to the Hollywood film, The Da Vinci Code Decca label
Vintage Alice/Dracula by David Del Tredici with the Cleveland Chamber Symphony, INNOVA label (2008)
Corigliano: Mr. Tambourine Man: Seven Poems Of Bob Dylan – Hila Plitmann (JoAnn Falletta; Buffalo Philharmonic Orchestra)
The Palm Trees Are Restless: Five Poems of Kate Gale, song cycle by Mark Abel, Delos label

Personal life 
From 1998 to 2017 she was married to composer Eric Whitacre.

References

External links

"A Heavenly Voice Keeps 'Da Vinci' Humming", Steve Inskeep on NPR about The Da Vinci Code

American operatic sopranos
Juilliard School alumni
Living people
1973 births
Israeli emigrants to the United States
Musicians from Jerusalem
Grammy Award winners
20th-century American women opera singers
21st-century American women opera singers